Kalpen Suresh Modi (born April 23, 1977), known professionally as Kal Penn, is an American actor, author, academic lecturer, and former White House staff member in the Barack Obama administration. As an actor he is known as Lawrence Kutner on the television program House, White House staffer Seth Wright on Designated Survivor, and Kumar Patel in the Harold & Kumar film series. He is also recognized for his performance in the film The Namesake. Penn has taught at the University of Pennsylvania in the Cinema Studies Program as a visiting lecturer.

In April 2009, Penn joined the Obama administration as the Principal Associate Editor in the White House Office of Public Engagement. This necessitated that his TV character, Lawrence Kutner, be written out of House. Penn briefly left his post in June 2010 to film the third installment of the Harold & Kumar series, A Very Harold & Kumar 3D Christmas, returning to his White House job upon the movie's completion. In July 2011, he again left the White House to accept a role in the television series How I Met Your Mother.

From 2016 to 2019, he played Seth Wright in the political drama Designated Survivor, where he also served as a consultant on the show. Additionally, he served as host of the game show Superhuman. In 2019, Penn portrayed Garrett Modi in the NBC sitcom series Sunnyside. The following year he went on to host a political talk miniseries on Freeform called Kal Penn Approves This Message.

Early life and education
He was born Kalpen Suresh Modi in Montclair, New Jersey, to Hindu Indian Gujarati immigrant parents. His mother, Asmita Bhatt, is a fragrance evaluator for a perfume company, and his father, Suresh Modi, is an engineer. His father is from Kaira and his mother was born in Baroda. Modi regularly visited Gujarat as a child during vacations, and he can speak some Gujarati as well as some Hindi. He has stated that stories of his grandparents marching with Mahatma Gandhi during the Indian independence movement were a significant influence on his interest in politics. He is Hindu.

Modi attended Marlboro Middle School in Marlboro Township, New Jersey, where he played baritone saxophone in the jazz band. He attended The Fine and Performing Arts Academy (a magnet program) as a Theater major at Howell High School for freshman year, then transferred to Freehold Township High School for his sophomore, junior, and senior years. Both schools are part of the Freehold Regional High School District in New Jersey. He was active in the schools' theater productions and competed on the Freehold Township National Honor Society Speech and Debate team (formerly known as Forensics). He then attended UCLA, where he double majored in film and sociology, graduating with a B.A. in 2000.

Career

Acting career
Penn's feature film debut came in 1998 in Express: Aisle to Glory. He has since appeared in American Desi, Van Wilder, the final episode of The Lonely Island,  Malibu's Most Wanted, A Lot Like Love, Dude, Where's the Party?, Love Don't Cost a Thing, Superman Returns, Epic Movie, The Namesake, the Harold & Kumar series, Buffy the Vampire Slayer, Angel (TV Series),and an uncredited appearance in Deck the Halls.

Penn says that he derived his acting name, Kal Penn, as a lark: "Almost as a joke to prove friends wrong, and half as an attempt to see if what I was told would work (that anglicized names appeal more to a white-dominated industry), I put 'Kal Penn' on my resume and photos." His audition callbacks rose by 50 percent. He has stated that he prefers his birth name and uses "Kal Penn" only for professional purposes.

In January 2007, Penn appeared in the first four episodes of the sixth season of 24 as Ahmed Amar, a teenage terrorist. Penn says he nearly turned down the role due to personal ethics:

I have a huge political problem with the role. It was essentially accepting a form of racial profiling. I think it's repulsive. But it was the first time I had a chance to blow stuff up and take a family hostage. As an actor, why shouldn't I have that opportunity? Because I'm brown and I should be scared about the connection between media images and people's thought processes?

Also in January 2007, he appeared in the spoof comedy Epic Movie as well as the television show Law & Order: Special Victims Unit. In May 2007, Penn received the Asian Excellence Award for Outstanding Actor for his performance in The Namesake. In fall 2007, Penn joined the cast of the Fox medical drama House as a fellowship applicant. E! reported that Penn had signed on as a regular on the show along with Olivia Wilde and Peter Jacobson and this was confirmed in the plot of the episode "Games". Penn continued with the series through to the episode "Simple Explanation", which aired April 6, 2009. He made an additional appearance as Lawrence Kutner on the fifth-season finale, "Both Sides Now", that aired on May 11, 2009. However, due to his new job at the White House, Penn could not be present for the filming of this episode. The clip of him saying "Too bad it isn't true" was taken from a previous filming. Penn returned to the show for the series finale.

In addition to his role on the TV series House, he is best known from his role in Harold & Kumar, as Kumar Patel, a pothead who goes with Harold Lee (John Cho) to White Castle for a hamburger. Unlike his character, he does not smoke marijuana, saying it is not for him, nor does he eat meat.

Penn had a recurring role on How I Met Your Mother for the seventh season of the show,  in which he played Kevin, a therapist and later boyfriend of Robin Scherbatsky.  Starting May 1, 2013, Penn hosted Big Brain Theory: Pure Genius on the Discovery Channel. In 2013, Penn joined the cast of We Are Men.

In 2014, he was cast in Ravi Kumar's film Bhopal: A Prayer for Rain, a film about the Bhopal gas tragedy, considered by many to be the world's worst industrial disaster. Penn played Detective Fontanelle White on the CBS comedy-drama Battle Creek, which was canceled during its first season.

In October 2016, Penn began a regular role in the ABC drama series Designated Survivor as Seth Wright, a White House speech writer who originally worked under the previous president's administration. Following the death of the White House Press Secretary in the pilot episode and the acting press secretary walking out on the job, his character gets promoted to Press Secretary. Penn also served as a political consultant for the series. The show was renewed by Netflix for a third season which was released on June 7, 2019.

Penn has expressed some interest in working in Indian cinema, particularly in Gujarati cinema.

On March 7, 2019, Penn was cast in the main role of Garrett Modi on the NBC comedy Sunnyside and the series was ordered on May 6, 2019. The show was cancelled after eight episodes were produced.

On May 9, 2020, Penn was cast as a lead on the 2021 CBS thriller drama series Clarice, a sequel to The Silence of the Lambs.

On December 2, 2021, Penn was set to produce and star in the biopic Superfan which depicts the story of Nav Bhatia.

In 2022, he was cast as Simon Choksi/Santa on The Santa Clauses.

Political activities

Penn was an advocate for Barack Obama's presidential campaign in 2007 and 2008 and a member of Obama's National Arts Policy Committee. He appears in the Barack Obama-supporting video "Sí Se Puede Cambiar" by Andres Useche and appeared with comedian George Lopez on January 18, 2009, at "We Are One: The Obama Inaugural Celebration at the Lincoln Memorial".

In early 2009, Penn was offered the position of Associate Director of the White House Office of Public Engagement and Intergovernmental Affairs, which he accepted. This necessitated his character Lawrence Kutner being written out of the TV series House. In his new role with the Obama administration, Penn served as a liaison with the Asian-American and Pacific Islander communities. He went back to using his birth name, Kalpen Modi.

Having made a commitment before his employment at the White House, Penn left his post as Obama's associate director of public engagement on June 1, 2010, to return to his acting career. He returned to office on November 15, 2010, following completion of A Very Harold & Kumar 3D Christmas.

Penn was a co-chair of Obama's reelection campaign. On September 3, 2012, he hosted coverage of the 2012 Democratic National Convention in Charlotte, North Carolina. Penn's speech at the convention encouraged young people to register to vote and defended Obama's record.

On November 18, 2013, Obama appointed Penn to serve on the President's Committee on the Arts and Humanities. On February 28, 2014, Penn served as the Master of Ceremonies for the White House Student Film Festival.

Penn publicly supported Bernie Sanders for the 2016 Democratic nomination. He campaigned for Hillary Clinton after she became the nominee.

In August 2017, Penn and the other members of the President's Committee on the Arts and Humanities resigned in protest of President Donald Trump's remarks about the Unite the Right rally in Charlottesville, Virginia.

During the 2020 Democratic presidential primaries, Penn expressed interest in the messages of Pete Buttigieg, Bernie Sanders, and Elizabeth Warren. He later expressed support for Joe Biden after he became the nominee.

Other ventures
In 2008, Penn served as a visiting lecturer in Asian American Studies at the University of Pennsylvania. His course was titled "Images of Asian Americans in the Media".

In 2014, Penn was working on a graduate certificate in international security from Stanford University.

On January 2, 2017, Penn won the "MasterChef Celebrity Showdown" and donated the $25,000 cash prize to UNRWA, a United Nations relief and human development agency that supports Palestinian refugees. On January 28, 2017, following a racist comment from a user on Penn's Twitter feed, Penn crowd-funded a fundraiser for refugees of the Syrian Civil War and raised $813,533. This occurred during President Donald Trump's Executive Order 13769, which banned immigration to the United States from Syria, Yemen, Sudan, Iran, Iraq, Libya, and Somalia regardless of visa status.

Personal life
In October 2021, while promoting his memoir, You Can’t Be Serious, Penn announced that he and his boyfriend of 11 years, named Josh, were engaged to be married. In regard to his sexual orientation, Penn said that he had "discovered [his] own sexuality as gay relatively late in life compared to many other people." However, he feels that "there's no timeline on this stuff. People figure their shit out at different times in their lives, so I'm glad I did when I did."

Filmography

Film

Television

See also
 Indians in the New York City metropolitan area
 LGBT people from New York City

References

External links

 
 Office of Public Engagement
 

1977 births
20th-century American male actors
21st-century American male actors
American male film actors
American male television actors
American comedians of Indian descent
American civil servants
American actor-politicians
American male actors of Indian descent
American people of Gujarati descent
American Hindus
Freehold Township High School alumni
Howell High School (New Jersey) alumni
LGBT appointed officials in the United States
LGBT Hindus
LGBT male actors
LGBT people from New Jersey
American LGBT people of Asian descent
Living people
Male actors from New Jersey
New Jersey Democrats
Obama administration personnel
People from Freehold Township, New Jersey
People from Marlboro Township, New Jersey
Stanford University alumni
University of California, Los Angeles alumni
Competitive debaters
Gay memoirists
American gay writers